Carlton County is a county in the State of Minnesota, formed in 1857. As of the 2020 census, the population was 36,207. Its county seat is Carlton.  Part of the Fond du Lac Indian Reservation lies in northeastern Carlton County.

Carlton County is part of the Duluth, MN-WI Metropolitan Statistical Area.

Geography
Carlton County lies on Minnesota's eastern edge. Its eastern boundary abuts Wisconsin. The Saint Louis River flows east-southeast through the county, discharging into Lake Superior. The Moose Horn River flows southwest through the county, discharging into the Kettle River. The Nemadji River and the South Fork Nemadji River flow east through the county, meeting a few miles east of its eastern boundary before reaching Lake Superior. The county terrain consists of low rolling hills, heavily wooded, and slopes to the several river valleys. The county's northwest corner lies at 1,329' (405m) ASL, and a small hill 0.2 miles (0.35 km) west of Rogers Lake rises to 1,450' (442m) ASL.

Major highways

  Interstate 35
  Minnesota State Highway 23
  Minnesota State Highway 27
  Minnesota State Highway 33
  Minnesota State Highway 45
  Minnesota State Highway 73
  Minnesota State Highway 210
  Minnesota State Highway 289

Adjacent counties

 Saint Louis County - north
 Douglas County, Wisconsin - east
 Pine County - south
 Aitkin County - west

Protected areas

 Black Hoof Wildlife Management Area
 Dye State Wildlife Management Area
 Fond du Lac State Forest (part)
 Jay Cooke State Park
 Kettle Lake State Wildlife Management Area
 Nemadji State Forest (part)
 Sawyer State Wildlife Management Area

History
Under a 1854 Treaty of La Pointe the Fond du Lac Indian Reservation and other reservations were established in exchange for all the Lake Superior Ojibwe land in the Arrowhead Region. Carlton County was formed and organized in 1870. It was named for Reuben B. Carlton, a member of the Minnesota Senate (1857–58).

In October 1918, an immense forest fire occurred, known as the Cloquet Fire. The Carlton County Historical Society hosts a permanent exhibit about the fire of 1918, along with ones about the Ojibwe of Carlton County and the Logging Era.

Climate and weather

Demographics

2020 census

Note: the US Census treats Hispanic/Latino as an ethnic category. This table excludes Latinos from the racial categories and assigns them to a separate category. Hispanics/Latinos can be of any race.

As of the 2010 census, there were 35,386 people living in the county. 89.7% were White, 5.9% Native American, 1.4% Black or African American, 0.5% Asian, 0.2% of some other race and 2.4% of two or more races. 1.4% were Hispanic or Latino (of any race). 16.4% were of German, 13.5% Finnish, 8.9% Norwegian, 8.6% Swedish and 5.6% American ancestry.

As of the 2000 census, there were 31,671 people, 12,064 households, and 8,408 families in the county. The population density was 36.8/sqmi (14.2/km2). There were 13,721 housing units at an average density of 15.9/sqmi (6.15/km2). The racial makeup of the county was 91.75% White, 0.97% Black or African American, 5.19% Native American, 0.35% Asian, 0.01% Pacific Islander, 0.21% from other races, and 1.52% from two or more races.  0.84% of the population were Hispanic or Latino of any race. 18.5% were of German, 16.9% Finnish, 12.5% Norwegian, 11.8% Swedish and 5.8% Polish ancestry. 95.5% spoke English, 1.8% Finnish and 1.1% Spanish as their first language.

There were 12,064 households, out of which 32.60% had children under the age of 18 living with them, 56.50% were married couples living together, 9.00% had a female householder with no husband present, and 30.30% were non-families. 26.10% of all households were made up of individuals, and 12.00% had someone living alone who was 65 years of age or older.  The average household size was 2.50 and the average family size was 3.00.

The county population contained 25.40% under the age of 18, 7.70% from 18 to 24, 28.40% from 25 to 44, 23.50% from 45 to 64, and 15.10% who were 65 years of age or older. The median age was 38 years. For every 100 females there were 102.70 males. For every 100 females age 18 and over, there were 102.20 males.

The median income for a household in the county was $40,021, and the median income for a family was $48,406. Males had a median income of $38,788 versus $25,555 for females. The per capita income for the county was $18,073. About 5.40% of families and 7.90% of the population were below the poverty line, including 8.20% of those under age 18 and 9.30% of those age 65 or over.

Communities

Cities

 Barnum
 Carlton (county seat)
 Cloquet
 Cromwell
 Kettle River
 Moose Lake
 Scanlon
 Thomson
 Wrenshall
 Wright

Census-designated places
 Big Lake
 Esko
 Mahtowa

Unincorporated communities

 Atkinson
 Automba
 Duesler
 Harney
 Holyoke
 Iverson
 Nemadji
 Otter Creek
 Pleasant Valley
 Sawyer
 Scotts Corner

Townships

 Atkinson Township
 Automba Township
 Barnum Township
 Beseman Township
 Blackhoof Township
 Eagle Township
 Holyoke Township
 Kalevala Township
 Lakeview Township
 Mahtowa Township
 Moose Lake Township
 Perch Lake Township
 Silver Township
 Silver Brook Township
 Skelton Township
 Split Rock Township
 Thomson Township
 Twin Lakes Township
 Wrenshall Township

Unorganized territories
 Clear Creek
 North Carlton

Government and politics

Local government
As of 2019, the Carlton County Sheriff is Kelly Lake. The Carlton County Board of Commissioners has five members, each representing one district. In April 2019 Lake and the Fond du Lac Police Department collaborated on sex trafficking training on behalf of other sheriff agencies that would be affected by the upcoming Enbridge Line 3. In 2017, Carlton County published a detailed Jail & Criminal Justice System Planning Study. As of 2019, Carlton County Public Health employs 36 county staff and 6 contract staff. It has been operating since 1920.

National
Carlton County voters lean Democratic. The Democratic Party has carried the county in every presidential election since 1928, though Donald Trump lost by only 300 votes in 2016 and 307 votes in 2020.

See also
 National Register of Historic Places listings in Carlton County, Minnesota

References

External links
 Carlton County official website
 Carltoncountyhelp.org: A guide to service organizations in Carlton County MN
 Mn/DOT – map of Carlton County

 
Minnesota counties
1870 establishments in Minnesota
Populated places established in 1870